Violeta Mițul (born 3 April 1997) is a Moldovan footballer who plays as a left-back and has appeared for the Moldova women's national team.

Career
Mițul has been capped for the Moldova national team, appearing for the team during the 2019 FIFA Women's World Cup qualifying cycle.

See also
List of Moldova women's international footballers

References

External links
 
 
 

1997 births
Living people
Moldovan women's footballers
Women's association football fullbacks
Moldova women's international footballers
Moldovan expatriate women's footballers
Moldovan expatriate sportspeople in Armenia
Expatriate footballers in Armenia
Moldovan expatriate sportspeople in Italy
Expatriate women's footballers in Italy
Moldovan expatriates in Spain
Expatriate women's footballers in Spain